{{DISPLAYTITLE:1-Deoxy-D-xylulose 5-phosphate}}

1-Deoxy--xylulose 5-phosphate is an intermediate in the non-mevalonate pathway.

See also
 DXP synthase
 DXP reductoisomerase

Monosaccharide derivatives
Organophosphates